John H. Hendrickson (October 20, 1872 – February 24, 1925) was an American sport shooter who competed in the 1912 Summer Olympics.

Biography
Hendrickson was born in Long Island, New York.

In 1912 he won the gold medal as member of the American team in the team clay pigeon shooting. In the individual trap event he finished 41st.

He died in Queens, New York.

References

1872 births
1925 deaths
American male sport shooters
Shooters at the 1912 Summer Olympics
Olympic gold medalists for the United States in shooting
Trap and double trap shooters
Olympic medalists in shooting
Medalists at the 1912 Summer Olympics
19th-century American people
20th-century American people